Bernstorffsvej station is a commuter rail railway station serving the northeastern part of the district of Hellerup in Gentofte Municipality in the northern suburbs of Copenhagen, Denmark.

The station is located on the Hillerød branch of the S-train network in Copenhagen, Denmark, served by the E-line between Høje Taastrup station and Holte station while the longer A-line doesn't stop at this station. The station is served every 10th minute in each direction. The station was opened on 15 May 1936, together with the S-train line Hellerup-Holte. It has altered very little since, except for the addition of a lift and a viaduct across Bernstorffsvej, which was rebuilt in 1969. The station is in need of renovation and has been unmanned for many years. Tickets can be purchased from an automat or via SMS/internet.

See also
 List of railway stations in Denmark

References

S-train (Copenhagen) stations
Railway stations opened in 1936
1936 establishments in Denmark
Knud Tanggaard Seest railway stations
Railway stations in Denmark opened in the 20th century